David O'Connor is an American former ice hockey coach and player. He was the interim head coach of the University of New Hampshire for a year while head coach Bob Kullen was recovering from a heart transplant.

Career
O'Connor played for the Wildcats hockey team in the mid-60's for the brief time while the team played in the lower classification while also playing for the football team. He returned to his alma mater in 1972 as an assistant coach for the football program and remained with the team for the next 18 seasons. In 1976 he added to his coaching responsibilities by becoming an assistant for the hockey team, a post he held until 1987 when he was named as the interim head coach for the 1987–88 season. O'Conner stepped away from the hockey team afterwards but returned for one more season as an assistant in 1992 before retiring.

He was inducted into UNH sports hall of fame in 2008.

Head coaching record

References

External links

Year of birth missing (living people)
Living people
American ice hockey coaches
Ice hockey coaches from Massachusetts
New Hampshire Wildcats men's ice hockey coaches
New Hampshire Wildcats men's ice hockey players
New Hampshire Wildcats football players
People from Belmont, Massachusetts
Sportspeople from Middlesex County, Massachusetts
Ice hockey players from Massachusetts